In Search of Reason is a 2000 sculpture by Sergio Bustamante, installed along Puerto Vallarta's Malecón, in the Mexican state of Jalisco.

See also

 2000 in art

References

External links
 

2000 sculptures
Centro, Puerto Vallarta
Outdoor sculptures in Puerto Vallarta
Statues in Jalisco